In India, a devadasi was a female artist who was dedicated to the worship and service of a deity or a temple for the rest of her life. The dedication took place in a ceremony that was somewhat similar to a marriage ceremony. In addition to taking care of the temple and performing rituals, these women also learned and practiced classical Indian artistic traditions such as Bharatanatyam, Mohiniyattam, Kuchipudi, and Odissi. Their social status was high as dance and music were an essential part of temple worship.

Between the sixth and thirteenth centuries, Devadasis had a high rank and dignity in society and were exceptionally affluent as they were seen as the protectors of the arts. During this period royal patrons provided them with gifts of land, property, and jewellery.  After becoming Devadasis, the women would spend their time learning religious rites, rituals, and dances. Devadasis were expected to live a life of celibacy, however, there have been instances of exceptions.

During the period of British rule in the Indian subcontinent, kings who were the patrons of temples lost their power, thus the temple artist communities also lost their significance. As a result, Devadasis were left without their traditional means of support and patronage and were now commonly associated with temple prostitution. The practice of Devadasi was banned during British rule, starting with the Bombay Devadasi Protection Act in 1934. The colonial view of Devadasi practices remains debated as the British colonial government were unable to distinguish the Devadasis from non-religious street dancers.

The Devadasi system though is still in existence in rudimentary form but with social activism state governments of different states at different times outlawed this ritual such as Andhra Pradesh Devdasis (Prohibition of dedication) Act, 1988, or the Madras Devdasis Act 1947.

History
The practice became significant when one of the great queens of the Somavamshi dynasty decided that in order to honour the gods, certain women who were trained in classical dancing, should be married to the deities. The inception of the practice was one that was imbued with great respect as the women who were chosen to become devadasi were subject to two great honors: first, because they were literally married to the deity, they were to be treated as if they were the goddess Lakshmi herself,  and second, the women were honored  because they were considered to be “those great women who (could) control natural human impulses, their five senses  and [could] submit themselves completely to God.” As they were married to an immortal, the women  were  considered to be  auspicious. Their main duties, in addition to committing to a life without marriage (to a mortal, in the common, popular sense), were to take care of a temple and learn classical Indian dances, usually the Bharatnatyam, which they would perform at temple rituals. Patrons were considered to have higher status for their ability to financially sponsor Devadasis.

According to temple worship rules, or Agamas, dance and music are the necessary aspects of daily puja for temple deities. Devadasis were known by various local terms such as Basivi in Karnataka, Matangi in Maharashtra, and Kalavantin in Goa and Damaon. Devadasis were also known as Jogini, Venkatasani, Nailis, Muralis and Theradiyan. Devadasi is sometimes referred to as a caste (varna); however some question the accuracy of this usage. "According to the devadasi themselves there exists a devdasi 'way of life' or 'professional ethic' (vritti, murai) but not a devadasi jāti (sub-caste). Later, the office of devdasi became hereditary but it did not confer the right to work without adequate qualification" (Amrit Srinivasan, 1985).

Ancient and medieval period

The definite origin of the Devadasi tradition is murky due to its early inception. The first known mention of a Devadasi is to a girl named Amrapali, who was declared nagarvadhu by the king during the time of the Buddha. Many scholars have noted that the tradition has no basis in scriptures. A.S. Altekar states that, "the custom of association of dancing girls with temples is unknown to Jataka literature. It is not mentioned by Greek writers, and the Arthashastra, which describes in detail the life of Ganik, is silent about it."

The tradition of female artists in temples is said to have developed during the 3rd century CE. A reference to such dancers is found in the Meghadūta of Kālidāsa, a classical poet and Sanskrit writer of the Gupta Empire. The first confirmed reference to a Devadasi was during the Keshari Dynasty in the 6th century CE in South India. Other sources include the works of authors such as Xuanzang, a Chinese traveller, and Kalhana, a Kashmiri historian. An inscription dated to the 11th century suggests that there were 400 Devadasi attached to the Tanjore temple in South India. Similarly, there were 500 Devdasi at the Someshwer shrine of Gujarat. Between the 6th and 13th centuries, Devadasi had a high rank and dignity in society and were exceptionally affluent as they were seen as the protectors of the arts. During this period royal patrons provided them with gifts of land, property, and jewellery.

Devdasis in South India and the Chola Empire
The Chola empire supported the Devdasi system; in Tamil Devdasis were known as Devar Adigalar, ("Deva" means "Divine" and "Adigalar" "Servants", i.e. "Servants of the Divine"). Both male and female Devadasi were dedicated to the service of a temple and its deity. The Chola empire developed the tradition of music and dance employed during temple festivals.

Inscriptions indicate that 400 dancers, along with their gurus and orchestras, were maintained by the Brihadeesvarar temple, Thanjavur, with munificent grants including the daily disbursement of oil, turmeric, betel leaves, and nuts. Nattuvanars were the male accompanists of the Devadasis during their performances. The Nattuvanars conducted the orchestra while the Devadasi performed her service. Inscriptions indicate that Nattuvanars taught the Chola princess Kuntavai.

As the Chola empire expanded in wealth and size, more temples were built throughout the country. Soon other emperors started imitating the Chola empire and adopted Devadasi systems of their own.

Natavalollu
A community of Karnataka living in Andhra Pradesh, the Natavalollu were are also known as Nattuvaru, Bogam, Bhogam, and Kalavanthulu.

It was customary in the Krishna district of Tenali for each family to give one girl to the Devadasi system. These dancers were known as Jakkulas. As part of a social reform, a written agreement was made to formally end the practice.

Ādapāpas were female attendants to the ladies of the families of Zamindars. Ādapāpas led a life of prostitution as they were not allowed to marry. In some places such as the Krishna and Godāvari districts, Ādapāpas were known as Khasa or Khasavandlu.

Natavalollu/Kalawants were a community that was distributed throughout the state of Andhra Pradesh. They were also referred to as Devadasi, Bogamvallu, Ganikulu, and Sani. Kalavantulu means one who is engaged in art. Davesh Soneji writes that, "By the early twenty-first century, large numbers of women in the Kalavanthulu community had converted to Christianity, because this promised them a stable monthly income as members of the new rehabilitation programs of these missions."

Mahari Devadasi of Odisha 
In the eastern state of Odisha Devadasis were known colloquially as Maharis of the Jagannath temple complex. The term Devadasi referred to the women who danced inside the temple. Devadasi, or mahari, means "those great women who can control natural human impulses, their five senses and can submit themselves completely to God (Vachaspati)." Mahari means Mahan Nari that is, the woman belonging to God. Sri Chaitanayadev had defined Devadasis as Sebayatas who served God through dance and music. Pankaj Charan Das, the oldest guru of Odissi classical dance and who comes from a Mahari family, defines Mahari as Maha Ripu-Ari, one who conquers the five main ripus - enemies.

Unlike other parts of India, the Odia Mahari Devadasis were never sexually liberal and were expected to remain celibate upon becoming Devadasis. However, there are records of Odia Mahari Devadasi having relationships and children. It is said that the daughters of the Maharis of the Jagannath temple took to other professions such as nursing in the mid-20th century due to stigma attached to their inherent profession, which may suggest prostitution.

The 1956 Orissa Gazette lists nine Devadasis and eleven temple musicians. By 1980, only four Devadasis were left – Harapriya, Kokilaprabha, Parashmani, and Shashimani. By 1998, only Shashimani and Parashmani were still alive. The daily ritualistic dance had stopped, although Shashimani and Parashmani served in a few of the yearly temple rituals such as Nabakalebara, Nanda Utsava, and Duara Paka during Bahuda Jatra. The last of the Devadasis, Shashimani, died on 19 March 2015, at the age of 92.

Yellamma Cult of Karnataka in South India
In the southern Indian state of Karnataka the Devadasi system was practiced for over 10 centuries. Chief among them was the Yellamma cult.

There are many stories about the origin of the Yellamma cult. The most popular story indicates that Renuka was the daughter of a Brahmin, married the sage Jamadagni, and was the mother of five sons. She used to bring water from the Malaprabha river for the sage's worship and rituals. One day at the river she saw a group of youths engaged in water sports and forgot to return home in time for her husband's worship and rituals, which made Jamadagni question her chastity. He ordered their sons one by one to punish their mother, but four of them refused on one pretext or the other. The sage cursed them to become eunuchs and had Renuka beheaded by his fifth son, Parashuram. To everybody's astonishment, Renuka's head multiplied by tens and hundreds and moved to different regions. This miracle inspired her four eunuch sons as well as others to become her followers and worship her head.

Colonial Era

Reformists and abolitionists
Reformists and abolitionists considered the Devadasi a social evil due to their way of life, which had very widely degenerated into a system of prostitution. The first anti-Nautch and anti-dedication movement began in 1882, even though the British colonial authorities officially maintained most brothels in India.  The Irish missionary Amy Carmichael was active in helping Devadasi women to escape their situation.

In later period  the devadasis were equated with prostitutes and their children were again given away to temples. Stigma was attached to a particular caste of devadasis and they were seen as prostitutes. After a certain age they were left to fend for themselves.

As the Devadasi were equated with prostitutes, they also became associated with the spread of the venereal disease syphilis in India. During the British colonial period many British soldiers were exposed to venereal diseases in brothels, and Devadasis were misunderstood to be responsible. In an effort to control the spread of venereal disease the British Government mandated that all prostitutes register themselves. Devadasis were required to register, as they were thought to be prostitutes by the British Government.

In addition to obligatory registration, the British Government also established institutions known as Lock Hospitals where women were brought in order to be treated for venereal diseases. However, many of the women admitted to these hospitals, including many Devadasi, were identified through the registry and then forcibly brought to the hospitals. A number of these women were confined in the hospitals permanently.

Today, Sitavva Joddati of Karnataka helps former Devadasi find a foothold in mainstream society. In 1982 she was made a Devadasi at age seven. In 1997 she began the non-governmental organisation MASS (Mahila Abhivrudhi-Samrakshana Sansthe) in the Belagavi district of Ghataprabha to help women like her escape the Devadasi system and live a life of dignity. Between 1997 and 2017 MASS helped over 4,800 Devadasis reintegrate into mainstream society. In 2018 she received the Padmashri award at age 43.

Evolution of Bharathanatyam
Rukmini Devi Arundale, a theosophist trained in ballet, sought to re-appropriate the Devadasi dance traditions in a context perceived respectably by Indian society which had by then adopted the western morales. She altered the dance repertoire to exclude pieces perceived as erotic in their description of a deity. She also systematized the dance in a way that incorporated the extension and use of space associated with dance traditions such as ballet. The product of this transformation was a new version of Bharatnatyam, which she taught professionally at the Kalakshetra school she established in Madras. Bharatnatyam is commonly seen as a very ancient dance tradition associated with the Natyasastra. However, Bharatnatyam as it is performed and known today is actually a product of Arundale's recent endeavour to remove the Devadasi dance tradition from the perceived immoral context associated with the Devadasi community and bring it into the upper caste performance milieu. She also adopted a lot of technical elements of Ballet into the modified form of Bharathanatyam. To give the dance form a measure of respect E Krishna Iyer and Rukmini Devi Arundale proposed a resolution at a 1932 meeting of the Madras Music Academy to rename Sadiraattam as "Bharatanatyam" or Indian dance.

Legislative Initiatives
The first legal initiative to outlaw the Devadasi system dates back to the 1934 Bombay Devadasi Protection Act. This act pertained to the Bombay province as it existed in the British Raj. The Bombay Devadasi Protection Act made dedication of women illegal, whether consensual or not. In 1947, the year of Indian independence, the Madras Devadasi (Prevention of Dedication) Act outlawed dedication in the southern Madras Presidency. The Devadasi system was formally outlawed in all of India in 1988, although social and economic pressures on mostly Dalit families have ensured that the Devadasi system is still widely practiced illegally.

Devadasi practices

From the late medieval period until 1910, the Pottukattu or tali-tying dedication ceremony, was a widely advertised community event requiring the full cooperation of the local religious authorities. It initiated a young girl into the Devadasi profession and was performed in the temple by a priest. In the Hindu tradition, marriage is viewed as the only religious initiation (diksha) permissible to women. Thus, the dedication was a symbolic "marriage" of the pubescent girl to the temple's deity.

In the sadanku or puberty ceremonies, the Devadasi initiate began her marriage with an emblem of the god borrowed from the temple as a stand-in bridegroom. From then onward, the Devadasi was considered a nitya sumangali, a woman eternally free from the adversity of widowhood. She would then perform her ritual and artistic duties in the temple. The puberty ceremonies were not only a religious occasion, but also a community feast and celebration in which the local elites also participated.

Odisha
The 1956 Orissa Gazette references Devadasis dances. They had two daily rituals. The Bahara Gaaunis would dance at the Sakaala Dhupa. After breakfast Lord Jagannatha would give Darshana to the bhaktas (the devotees). In the main hall, a Devadasi, accompanied by musicians and the Rajaguru (the court guru), would dance standing near the Garuda stambha (pillar). They would perform only pure dance, and could be watched by the audience. The Bhitara Gaunis would sing at the Badashinghara, the main ceremony for ornamenting and dressing the God. At bedtime, Lord Jagannatha would first be served by male Sebayatas, who would fan him and decorate him with flowers. After they left, a Bhitara Gaauni would then enter the room, stand near the door (Jaya Vijaya), sing Gita Govinda songs, and perhaps perform a ritualistic dance. Later she would come out and announce that the Lord has gone to sleep and the guard would close the main gate.

Social status
A Devadasi was believed to be immune from widowhood and was called akhanda saubhagyavati ("woman never separated from good fortune"). Since she was wedded to a divine deity, she was supposed to be one of the especially welcome guests at weddings and was regarded as a bearer of good fortune. At weddings, people would receive a string of the tali (wedding lock) prepared by her, threaded with a few beads from her own necklace. The presence of a Devadasi on any religious occasion in the house of a dvija member was regarded as sacred and she was treated with due respect, and was presented with gifts.

Contemporary statistical data
Indian National Commission for Women, which is mandated to protect and promote the welfare of women, collected information on the prevalence of Devadasi culture in various states. The government of Odisha stated that the Devadasi system is not prevalent in the state. There is only one Devadasi in Odisha, in a Puri temple. In March 2015, a newspaper report said that the last devadasi, Sashimoni, attached to Jagannath temple had died, bringing the curtain down on the institution.

Similarly, the government of Tamil Nadu wrote that this system has been eradicated and there are now no Devadasis in the state. Andhra Pradesh has identified 16,624 Devadasis within its state. The Karnataka State Women's University found more than 80,000 Devadasi Karnataka in 2018; while a government study found 40,600 in 2008. The government of Maharashtra did not provide the information as sought by the commission. However, the state government provided statistical data regarding the survey conducted by them to sanction a "Devadasi Maintenance Allowance". A total of 8,793 applications were received and after conducting a survey 6,314 were rejected and 2,479 Devadasis were declared eligible for the allowance. At the time of sending the information, 1,432 Devadasis were receiving this allowance.

According to a study by the Joint Women's Programme of Bangalore for National Commission for Women, girls who have to accept becoming a Devadasi, few reasons were provided, which included dumbness, deafness, poverty, and others. The life expectancy of Devadasi girls is low compared to the average of the country, it is rare to find Devadasis older than fifty.

In popular culture

See also
Isai Vellalar
Sacred prostitution
 Child prostitution
 Nagarvadhu
 Deuki
 Shamakhi dancers
 Gomantak Maratha Samaj
 Tawaif
 Nauch
 Chakyars and Nangyarammas of Kerala
 Kanjirottu Yakshi
Muthulaxmi Reddy
Hemalatha Lavanam

References

Further reading
 Altekar, A.S., The Position of Women in Hindu Civilization, Benaras: Motilal Banarasi Das, 1956.
 Amrit Srinivasan, "Reform and Revival: The Devadasi and Her Dance", Economic and Political Weekly, Vol. XX, No. 44, 2 November 1985, pp. 1869–1876.
 Artal R.O., "Basavis in Peninsular India", Journal of Anthropological Society of Bombay, Vol. IX, No. 2, 1910.
 Asha Ramesh, Impact of Legislative Prohibition of the Devadasi Practice in Karnataka: A Study, (Carried out under financial assistance from NORAD), May 1993.
 Banerjee, G.R., Sex Delinquent Women and Their Rehabilitation, Bombay: Tata Institute of Social Sciences, 1953.
 Basham, A.L., The Wonder That Was India, New York: Grove Press, 1954.
 Chakrabothy, K. (2000). Women as Devadasis: Origin and Growth of the Devadasi Profession. Delhi, Deep & Deep Publications.
 Chakrapani, C, "Jogin System: A Study in Religion and Society", Man in Asia, Vol. IV, No. II, 1991.
 Cornwall, Andrea (2016) Save us from Saviours: Disrupting Development Narratives of the Rescue and Uplift of the 'Third World Woman' in Hemer, Oscar and Thomas Tufte (Eds.) (2016) Voice and Matter: Communication, Development and the Cultural Return. Gothenburg: Nordicom.
 Crooke Williams, The Popular Religion and Folklore of Northern India, (Third Reprint), Delhi: Munshiram Manoharlal, 1968.
 Crooke, W., "Prostitution", Encyclopaedia of Religion and Ethics, Vol. X, Eds., James Hastings and Clark Edinburg, Second Impression, 1930.
 Desai Neera, Women in India, Bombay: Vora Publishers, 1957.
 Dubois Abbe J.A and Beachampes H.K., Hindu Manners, Customs and Ceremonies, Oxford: Clarendon Press, 1928
 Dumont Louis, Religion, Politics and History in India, The Hague, Mouton and Co., 1970
 Dumont Louis, Homo Hierarchius: The Caste System and Its Implications, Chicago: The University of Chicago Press, 1972.
 Durrani, K.S., Religion and Society, New Delhi: Uppal, 1983.
 Fuller Marcus B., The Wrongs of Indian Womanhood, Edinburgh: Oliphant Anderson and Ferrier, 1900.
 Goswami, Kali Prasad., Devadāsī: dancing damsel, APH Publishing, 2000.
 Gough Kathleen, "Female Initiation Rites on the Malabar Coast", Journal of the Royal Anthropological Institute, No. 85, 1952.
 Gupta Giri Raj, Religion in Modern India, New Delhi: Vikas Publishing House, 1983.
 Heggade Odeyar D., "A Socio-economic strategy for Rehabilitating Devadasis", Social Welfare, Feb–Mar 1983.
 Iyer, L.A.K, "Devadasis in South India: Their Traditional Origin And Development", Man in India, Vol.7, No. 47, 1927.
 Jain Devki, Women’s Quest for Power, New Delhi: Vikas Publishing House, 1980.
 Jogan Shankar, Devadasi Cult – A Sociological Analysis (Second Revised Edition), New Delhi: Ashish Publishing House, 1994.
 JOINT WOMEN’S PROGRAMME, Regional Centre, Bangalore, An Exploratory Study on Devadasi Rehabilitation Programme Initiated by Karnataka State Women's Development Corporation and SC/ST Corporation, Government of Karnataka in Northern Districts of Karnataka, Report Submitted to National Commission for Women, New Delhi, 2001–02 (year not mentioned in the report).
 JONAKI (The Glow Worm), Devadasi System: Prostitution with Religious Sanction, Indrani Sinha (Chief Editor), Calcutta, Vol.2 No.1 1998.
 Jordens, J.T.F., "Hindu Religions and Social Reform in British India", A Cultural History of India, Ed. A.L. Basham, Clarendon Press,
 Jordan, K. (2003). From Sacred Servant to Profane Prostitute; A history of the changing legal status of the Devadasis in India 1857–1947. Delhi, Manohar. Oxford, 1975.
 Kadetotad, N.K., Religion and Society among the Harijans of Yellammana Jogatiyaru Hagu Devadasi Paddati (Jogati of Yellamma and Devadasi Custom), Dharwad, Karnatak University Press (Kannada), 1983.
 Kala Rani, Role Conflict in Working Women, New Delhi: Chetna Publishers, 1976.
 Karkhanis, G.G., Devadasi: A Burning Problem of Karnataka, Bijapur: Radha Printing Works, 1959.
 Levine, P. (2000). "Orientalist Sociology and the Creation of Colonial Sexualities." Feminist Review 65(17): Pages:   5–21.
 Marglin, F.A., Wives of The God-king: Rituals of Devadasi of Puri, Delhi: Oxford University Press, 1985.
 Mies, M. (1980). Indian Women and Patriarchy. Delhi, Concept Publishers.
 Mies, M. (1986). Patriarchy and Accumulation on a World Scale: Women in the International Division of Labor. London, Zed Books Ltd.
 Mukherjee, A.B., "Female Participation in India: Patterns & Associations", Tiydschrift: Voor Econ, Geografie, 1972.
 Ostor Akos, Culture and Power, New Delhi: Sage Publications, 1971.
 Patil, B.R., "The Devadasis", in The Indian Journal of Social Work, Vol. XXXV, No. 4, January 1975, pp. 377–89
 Puekar S.D. and Kamalla Rao, A Study of Prostitution in Bombay, Bombay: Lalwani Publishing House, 1967.
 Rajaladshmi, Suryanarayana and Mukherjee, "The Basavis in Chittoor District of Andhra Pradesh", Man in India, Vol. 56, No. 4, 1976.
 Ranjana, "Daughters Married to Gods and Goddesses", Social Welfare, Feb–Mar 1983, pp. 28–31.
 Sahoo, B.B, "Revival of the Devadasi system", Indian Journal of Social Work, Vol 58, No 3, 1997.
 Srinivasan, K., Devadasi (a novel), Madras: Christian Literature Society, 1976.
 Sujana Mallika & Krishna Reddy, Devadasi System – A Universal Institution, Paper presented in the A.P. History Congress at Warangal, January 1990.
 Tarachand K.C., Devadasi Custom – Rural Social Structure and Flesh Markets, New Delhi: Reliance Publishing House, 1992.
 Upadhyaya, B.S., Women in Rig Veda, New Delhi: S. Chand & Co., 1974.
 Vasant Rajas, Devadasi: Shodh Ani Bodh (Marathi), Pune: Sugawa Prakashan, July 1997.
 Vijaya Kumar, S & Chakrapani, c 1993, Joginism: A Bane of Indian Women, Almora: Shri Almora Book Depot.
 Sanyal, Narayan, Sutanuka ekti debdasir nam (in Bengali).
 Lathamala, Hegge Vandu Payana (in Kannada).

External links

Devadasis - Sinned or Sinned Against? by Anil Chawla.
Given to Goddess - Article on the Yellama Cult of India, 31 July 2000
Slaves to the goddess of fertility by Damian Grammaticas - BBC News, 8 June 2007 in which it's claimed that devadasis are 'sanctified prostitutes'.
Serving the Goddess, The dangerous life of a sacred sex worker by William Dalrymple. The New Yorker, 4 August 2008
 Devadasi video Mystery - Article about 1930 video capture at Baroda
 Prostitutes of God- VICE Travel Documentary

Hindu temple dance
Cultural history of India
Courtesans by type